Artemisia arbuscula is a North American species of sagebrush known by the common names little sagebrush, low sagebrush, or black sagebrush. It is native to the western United States from Washington, Oregon, and California east as far as Colorado and Wyoming. It grows in open, exposed habitat on dry, sterile soils high in rock and clay content.

Description
Its many branches are covered in hairy leaves each less than a centimeter long. The inflorescence is a spike-shaped array of clusters of hairy flower heads. Each head contains a few pale yellow disc florets but no ray florets. The fruit is a tiny achene less than a millimeter wide.

Subspecies
 Artemisia arbuscula subsp. arbuscula 
 Artemisia arbuscula subsp. longiloba (Osterh.) L.M.Shultz
 Artemisia arbuscula subsp. thermopola Beetle - Idaho, Utah, Wyoming

References

External links
 
 
 Jepson Manual eFlora (TJM2) treatment of Artemisia arbuscula
 United States Department of Agriculture National Forest Service Info Sheet
 Save The Sagebrush Sea

arbuscula
Flora of the Western United States
Flora of the Great Basin
Flora of the Sierra Nevada (United States)
Flora of California
Plants described in 1841
Taxa named by Thomas Nuttall
Flora without expected TNC conservation status